Membrane alanyl aminopeptidase also known as alanyl aminopeptidase (AAP) or aminopeptidase N (AP-N) is an enzyme that in humans is encoded by the ANPEP gene.

Function 

Aminopeptidase N is located in the small-intestinal and renal microvillar membrane, and also in other plasma membranes. In the small intestine aminopeptidase N plays a role in the final digestion of peptides generated from hydrolysis of proteins by gastric and pancreatic proteases. Its function in proximal tubular epithelial cells and other cell types is less clear. The large extracellular carboxyterminal domain contains a pentapeptide consensus sequence characteristic of members of the zinc-binding metalloproteinase superfamily. Sequence comparisons with known enzymes of this class showed that CD13 and aminopeptidase N are identical. The latter enzyme was thought to be involved in the metabolism of regulatory peptides by diverse cell types, including small intestinal and renal tubular epithelial cells, macrophages, granulocytes, and synaptic membranes from the CNS. Defects in this gene appear to be a cause of various types of leukemia or lymphoma.

AAP is also used by some viruses as a receptor to which these viruses bind to and then enter cells. It is a receptor for human coronavirus 229E, feline coronavirus serotype II (FCoV-II), TGEV, PEDV, canine coronavirus genotype II (CCoV-II) as well as several Deltacoronaviruses.

References

Further reading

External links 
 The MEROPS online database for peptidases and their inhibitors: M01.001
 
 

Biomarkers
EC 3.4.11